Senator Edmondson may refer to:

Henry A. Edmondson (1833–1918), Virginia State Senate
J. Howard Edmondson (1925–1971), Oklahoma State Senate